The women's 1500 metres event at the 2023 European Athletics Indoor Championships was held on 3 March 2023 at 11:30 (heats), and on 4 March at 20:00 (final) local time.

Medalists

Records

Results

Heats 
Qualification: First 3 in each heat (Q) and the next 3 fastest (q) advance to the Final.

Final

References 

2023 European Athletics Indoor Championships
1500 metres at the European Athletics Indoor Championships